Capobianco is a surname. Notable people with the surname include:

Andrea Capobianco (born 1966), Italian basketball coach
Andrew Capobianco (born 1999), American U.S. Olympic diver
Bartolomeo Capobianco (died 1547), Italian bishop
Dean Capobianco (born 1970), Australian sprinter
Eliane Capobianco (born 1973), Bolivian politician
Fabrizio Capobianco (born 1970), Italian entrepreneur
Kyle Capobianco (born 1997), Canadian ice hockey player
Michael Capobianco (born 1950), American writer
Pier Antonio Capobianco (1619–1689), Italian bishop
Pietro Paolo Capobianco (died 1505), Italian bishop
Richard M. Capobianco (graduated 1979), American philosopher
Tito Capobianco (1931–2018), Argentine opera director

See also